Alice Roberts (born 1973) is British television presenter, anatomist, and osteoarchaeologist.

Alice Roberts may also refer to:

Alice Richardson (artist) (fl. 1769–1777), English pastellist who sometimes exhibited under the name Alice Roberts
Alice Roberts (actress) (1906–1985), Belgian actress
Caroline Alice Elgar (1848–1920), born C. Alice Roberts, wife of the English composer Edward Elgar